José Antonio Malagón Rubio (born 28 May 1988), known as Josete, is a Spanish footballer who plays for UCAM Murcia CF as a defender.

Club career
Born in Elche, Province of Alicante, Josete graduated from Elche CF's youth system, making his senior debut with the reserves in the 2007–08 season, in the Tercera División. On 19 June 2010, he appeared in his first professional game with the Valencians' first team, featuring the last eight minutes in a 4–1 Segunda División home win over Real Sociedad.

Josete competed in the Segunda División B the following years, representing Deportivo Alavés, Zamora CF and Cádiz CF. On 22 January 2016, he returned to the second division after agreeing to an 18-month contract with Real Oviedo. He scored his first goal in the latter league on 1 May, the only as the hosts defeated Córdoba CF.

On 12 July 2016, Josete rejoined Elche. The following 29 June, after suffering relegation, he signed a two-year deal with fellow division two club CD Lugo.

Josete returned to the third tier in summer 2020, with the 32-year-old agreeing to a contract at UCAM Murcia CF.

References

External links

1988 births
Living people
Spanish footballers
Footballers from Elche
Association football defenders
Segunda División players
Segunda División B players
Tercera División players
Divisiones Regionales de Fútbol players
Elche CF Ilicitano footballers
Elche CF players
Deportivo Alavés players
Zamora CF footballers
Cádiz CF players
Real Oviedo players
CD Lugo players
UCAM Murcia CF players